Mickey's Medicine Man is a 1931 Christmas-themed talkie short film in Larry Darmour's Mickey McGuire series starring a young Mickey Rooney. Directed by Friz Freleng, the two-reel short was released to theaters on August 22, 1945 by Columbia Pictures. It was one of the few Mickey McGuire shorts without Mickey Rooney in the cast.

Plot
Christmas is approaching, and Mickey feels sorry for the less fortunate children who will not be able to have a proper Christmas. Mickey and his pals decide to throw a party for the kids. They are able to get everything they need for the party except for one thing: a turkey.

Notes
This was one of the few Mickey McGuire shorts without Mickey Rooney in the cast. For reasons unknown, he was absent from the series during the period. Costar Marvin Stephens (who usually played the role of 'Katrink') took Mickey's place.

Cast
Marvin Stephens - Mickey McGuire
Billy Barty - Billy McGuire
Jimmy Robinson - Hambone Johnson
Delia Bogard - Tomboy Taylor
Donald Haines - Katrink'
Douglas Fox - Stinkie Davis

See also
 List of Christmas films

References

External links 
 

1931 films
1931 comedy films
1931 short films
1930s Christmas films
American black-and-white films
Mickey McGuire short film series
American comedy short films